Mary Smith Brook is a river in Delaware County, New York. It flows into Beaver Kill northwest of Lewbeach.

References

Rivers of New York (state)
Rivers of Delaware County, New York
Rivers of Sullivan County, New York